Marshall Islands participated at the 2018 Summer Youth Olympics in Buenos Aires, Argentina from 6 October to 18 October 2018.

Athletics

Swimming

Boys

Girls

Weightlifting

Marshall Islands was given a quota by the tripartite committee to compete in weightlifting.

Wrestling

Key:
  – Victory by Fall
  – Without any point scored by the opponent

References

2018 in Marshallese sports
Nations at the 2018 Summer Youth Olympics
Marshall Islands at the Youth Olympics